The Dapifer is an independent fashion publication dedicated to editorial photography, fashion industry news, art, and streetwear. The publication was founded by Lakenya Kelly during his undergraduate studies at Cornell University in 2010. Originally launched as a small streetwear blog, it released its first print issue in October 2011. Since then, the print edition has maintained a somewhat secretive release schedule. The Dapifer's past cover models have included eyewear designers Coco & Breezy and Aamito Lagum, winner of Africa's Next Top Model. , The Dapifer is owned by its founder and editor-in-chief Lakenya Kelly.

Contributors 
The fashion media platform has worked with brands and agencies including Ford Models, Wilhelmina Models, New York Models, Alexander McQueen, Saint Laurent, and La Jolla Fashion Film Festival. The title also routinely works with contemporary visual artists including Brooklyn-based painter Michael Alan. The Dapifer has a global presence and has been recognized in popular press including "Five New York City Events that You'll be Mad you Missed" by AXS and Models.com. In July 2016, Lakenya Kelly was appointed as a judge at La Jolla Fashion Film Festival alongside publications like L'Offiiciel.

Smartphone Application  
In 2015, The Dapifer shifted its focus to digital publishing in recognition of the steady decline of print publishing. The publication has released its own iOS and Android apps for mobile access to digital issues.

Creative Network 
In 2016, The Dapifer launched The Dapifer: The List, a private online networking site functioning as a career tool for creative professionals. Directed at photographers, models, stylists and creative professionals, the site can be compared to the networking site Model Mayhem. By signing up, members are granted access to castings, networking opportunities, and editorial photography submissions.

References

Visual arts magazines published in the United States
Fashion photography
Fashion magazines published in the United States
Fashion websites
Magazines established in 2010
Magazines published in New York City